Davey Lee (December 29, 1924 – June 17, 2008) was an American child actor. He was born in Hollywood, California, United States. He appeared in six feature films between 1928 and 1930.

Biography
The younger brother of actor Frankie Lee (19111970), at the age of three, Davey Lee made his screen debut in one of the early talkies, The Singing Fool (1928) starring Al Jolson, in which he played the part of "Sonny Boy". The Singing Fool remained the most successful film until Gone with the Wind (1939), produced by MGM. It was Warner Bros.' most successful film for more than ten years. The theme song "Sonny Boy" became the first film song to sell over a million copies. Lee also played the title role in the film Sonny Boy (1929), starring Betty Bronson. He returned to play opposite Al Jolson in Say It With Songs (1929).

Other films in which he appeared were Frozen River (1929), in which he played opposite canine film star Rin Tin Tin, Skin Deep (1929) as the son of John Bowers, and The Squealer (1930) as the son of Jack Holt. This was Lee's last film.

Davey was taken out of films by his mother reportedly so he could have a normal childhood. In 1986, Davey was brought over to the Piccadilly Theatre in London's West End to participate in the unveiling of a memorial bronze bust of Al Jolson to commemorate the official centenary of his birth. This theatre was chosen because, to the best of anyone's knowledge, it was the only UK stage which Jolson ever stood on, although he did not perform, he merely appeared to promote his film. The evening was presented by UK impresario David Lee, a Jolson devotee who had, many years before, chosen "David Lee" as his stage name without knowing of the connection to Jolson. The show featured tributes to Jolson from Clive Baldwin, David Jacobs and, of course, Davey Lee himself.

After suffering a stroke, Davey Lee was admitted to Windsor Gardens Healthcare Centre in Van Nuys, California, and died from natural causes in Los Angeles on June 17, 2008, aged 83.

Bibliography
 Holmstrom, John. The Moving Picture Boy: An International Encyclopaedia from 1895 to 1995, Norwich, Michael Russell, 1996, pp. 130–131.
 Best, Marc. Those Endearing Young Charms: Child Performers of the Screen, South Brunswick and New York: Barnes & Co., 1971, pp. 155–160.

External links

The International Al Jolson Society
Davey Lee at Virtual History

1924 births
2008 deaths
American male child actors
Male actors from Hollywood, Los Angeles
American male film actors
20th-century American male actors